The Gogo/Gongwe (singular: mgogo, plural: Wagogo) are a Bantu ethnic and linguistic group based in the Dodoma Region of central Tanzania. In 1992 the Gogo population was estimated to number 1,300,000. The Gogo have historically been predominantly pastoralist and patrilineal (tracing descent and inheritance through the male line), but many contemporary Gogo now practise settled agriculture, have migrated to urban areas, or work on plantations throughout Tanzania.

History

Their name was invented sometime in the 19th century by the Nyamwezi caravans passing through the area while it was still frontier territory. Richard Francis Burton claimed a very small population for it, saying only that a person could walk for two weeks and find only scattered Tembes. There was and remains the problem of inadequate rain for crops and humans, the rainy season being short and erratic with frequent drought. In the 18th century the Wagogo were mostly pioneer colonists from Unyamwezi and Uhehe, and are often confused with the Sandawe and the Kaguru. Half the ruling group came from Uhehe. They had a long tradition of hunting and gathering, allowing the Nyamwezi to carry the ivory to the coast, but had become agriculturalists with cattle by 1890. They continued, however, to have a low regard for working the land and are said to have treated their agricultural slaves badly.

The Wagogo experienced famine in 1881, 1885, and 1888–89 (just before Stokes' caravan arrived) and then again in 1894–95, and 1913–14. The main reason for the exceptional series of famines in Ugogo was its unreliable rainfall and the ensuing series of droughts.

Economy
Ugogo has had a mixed economy of agriculture and herding, but most heavily depended on grain from agriculture. Traditionally, cultivation work parties of about twenty men and women were held from January through March, and lasted all day with a beer party at the end. People came from an area less than five miles; mostly they were close neighbours.  Generally, however, agricultural cultivation played a secondary role to the livestock cycle.

Since grain can be extensively damaged by birds, bush pigs, wart hogs, and baboons, men and boys have the responsibility of protecting the fields, even at night. Several medicinal and supernatural methods were also used for protecting fields against wildlife and the evil influence of men.

In traditional agricultural practices, the average Wagogo did not possess a very large herd of cattle. Patterns changed, but it should be remembered that these cattle also belonged to relatives, kin, and clan members.

Traditional society

Social structure
Wagogo clans moved around a good deal, dropping ties to older groupings, adopting new links and family, new clan names, things to avoid, affiliations, and new ritual functions.  The Gogo, in short, became different from what they were before.

While early European writers emphasised the political chiefs of the Wagogo, calling them 'Sultans' as was customary on the coast, and stressed their collection of the very profitable taxes (hongo), on scarce food and water, it was really the ritual leaders who influenced the entire country. They controlled rainmaking and fertility, medicines to protect against natural disasters or hazards, and prevented certain resources from being overly used. They were not to leave their "country," they were to be rich in cattle, decided on circumcision and initiation ceremonies, give supernatural protection for all undertakings and be arbitrators in homicide, witchcraft accusations, and serious assault.

The Wagogo placed considerable value on neighbourliness. After having his physical needs met, a strange traveller would be accompanied many miles by the young men of a homestead in order to place him safely on his way. The homestead group was so fundamental to Gogo society that people who had died peculiarly, (struck down by lighting or a contagious disease) were thrown into the bush or the trunk of a baobab tree, for such a person had no homestead and could become an "evil spirit" who associated with sorcerers or witches.

Family
Most brothers went to great lengths to assist their sisters, who often lived with their brothers in sickness until they recovered, for brothers have strong moral and legal obligations to fulfil these duties in cooperation with their sisters' husbands.  Even later in life, sisters and brothers continue to visit each other, a wife never being fully incorporated into her husband's group.

Marriage
While the majority of Wagogo have only one wife at any given time, most found polygyny to be highly valued and carrying a high priority. It was the prerogative of older, well-established men. A reasonably prosperous man could hope to have two and sometimes three wives, and sometimes together.

Most marriages took place within a day's walking distance after agreement was reached on the number of livestock to be included in the bridewealth, only then is the transfer made.  Even a hundred years later, bridewealth is still normally given entirely in livestock and a high proportion of court cases involve the payment or return of the brideprice. Even after divorce, all children born during the marriage belonged to the ex-husband, "where the cattle came from."  "If you go somewhere and marry the child of others, then all your wife's relatives become your relatives, because you have married the child, and so you will love even them.("From Rigby's book Cattle and Kinship")  Lovers of married women could never, however, claim their offspring. If a husband had given the brideprice for his wife who was pregnant before he married her, he must still accept paternity of the child.Defense
Defence against the Kisongo, Maasai, and Wahehe was organized and based on age groups of warriors, much as the Maasai. This "military" organization was mostly used for local defence, although it could be used for cattle raids against others. When an alarm was sounded all able-bodied men were to take up arms and run towards the call (this did not always work smoothly).

Historical accounts
In 1878 Edward Hore described them as "hongo squeezing Wagogo."
The Germans greatly admired their physiques and cattle; otherwise they concurred with Emin Pasha, Henry Stanley, and Edward Hore.  Thirty years later, the British also found the Wagogo to be "uninterested in progress."
In his book In Darkest Africa'' Henry M. Stanley, while "rescuing" Emin Pasha in order to bring him to the coast, writes,

Prominent Gogo people
The Wagogo have produced some of the big names in Tanzanian Politics, Music and Society.
Yohana Madinda, the first African bishop of Anglican Diocese of Central Tanganyika (1923–1989)
Godfrey Mdimi Mhogolo, the longest-serving bishop of the Anglican Diocese of Central Tanganyika (1989–2014) He was the first Tanzanian bishop to ordain women and championed their development in the church
Hukwe Zawose (1938–2003), Musician
Mzee Mchoya Malogo, Musician, leader of the Nyati group from Nzali
John Mtangoo, musician
John S. Malecela, politician and former Prime Minister
Job Lusinde, politician and ambassador
William Jonathan Kusila (MP), Politician
Hezekiah N. Chibulunje, former MP and former Deputy Minister
John Chiligati, former MP and former Minister
Fredrick  Chiwanga, Lecturer, Diplomat, Editor, Translator and Interpreter (French, English, Kiswahili, Kigogo), Sokoine University of Agriculture
Mzee Pancras M. Ndejembi, Politician
Simon Chiwanga, retired bishop of Anglican Diocese of Mpwapwa and former Chair of the Anglican Consultative Council (ACC)
Njamasi Chiwanga, an academician and conservationist working at a local environmental conservation NGO - LEAD Foundation based in Dodoma Tanzania.
Patrick Balisidya, Musician
Simon Chiwanga, Environmental Management Scientist, Water Sanitation and Hygiene Expert and Activist, Public Health and Toxicology Researcher; Currently working as the Program Manager - Malaria and Child Health in PSI Tanzania. He is also a Theologian and Canon of the Anglican Church of Tanzania, Gospel Musician and member of the synod of the Diocese of Mara.
Kedmon Mapanha, Lecturer II, University of Dar es Salaam 
Emmanuel Mbennah, is an accomplished academic, with two earned PhD degrees, former International Director for the Africa Region for TWR International. Professor Mbennah is the Vice Chancellor of St John's University of Tanzania since September 2014. 
Palamagamba John Aidan Mwaluko Kabudi, a professor of law and currently a Member of Parliament and the Minister for Constitutional Affairs and Justice.
Christopher M. M. Nyamwanji, a holder of an MBA from Mzumbe University, Development facilitator, and Chairman for SUDESO based in Tabora.
Emmanuel R. Chidong'oi, Founder and Managing Director - Tanzania Organization for Agricultural Development (TOfAD),  a First President - Ecosystem Based Adaptation for Food Security Assembly (EBAFOSA)Tanzania and Coordinator - Eastern Africa Agriculture Practitioner's Organization (EAAPO), A Managing Director of Tanzania Initiative for Development Effectiveness (TIDE) and a Member of Global CSOs Partnership for Development Effectiveness - Working Group on Conflict and Fragility (CPDE - WGCF)
Frank P Menda, Lecturer II, University of Dodoma.
Bahati Richardson Chinyelle,Ophthalmologist, Accountant and Financial Analyst,English, Swahili and Gogo Translator, founder of YES I DO - Afrika (NGO) and Co-founder and Board Chair of LAUBRINS International Co.Ltd with extensive background experience locally and internationally with renowned organizations including the WHO, HKI, GSM,SALT Int'nal, MoHSW-TZ etc
Benard Michael Paul Mnyang'anga, aka Ben Pol, musician
Eng. Raphael Pascal Menda, The President and founder of COYESA CO.LTD. He is expert in Land, Civil, Architectural, Env, ICT, Dam & Borehole drilling technology e.t.c
 Prof Titus Alfred Makudali Msagati. Professor of Analytical and Environmental Chemistry at the College of Science, Engineering, and Technology, University of South Africa. URL: https://scholar.google.co.za/citations?user=4S59Ud8AAAAJ&hl=en

References

 Afropop website
 Bauer, Andreus. (Street of Caravans)
 Emin Pasha. (Vol. 2.)
 Ethnologue entry: Gogo language
 Iliffe, John. (A Modern History of Tanganyika)
 (Mankind, The Illustrated Encycloupedia of)
 Rigby, Peter. (Cattle and Kinship Among the Gogo)
 Stanley, H. (In Darkest Africa)
 Wagogo music

Ethnic groups in Tanzania